Geoffrey Freshwater is an English actor.  His television appearances include The Government Inspector and the recurring character of Sgt Eric Rivers in 5 episodes of Foyle's War. He was also a member of the Royal Shakespeare Company, appearing in their 2007-08 This England cycle of Shakespeare's history plays.

As a young actor, Geoffrey Freshwater was engaged in 1972 for a repertory season by Newpalm Productions at the Civic Theatre, Chelmsford, appearing in productions such as Oh, What a Lovely War!. In 1982 he appeared in Alan Plater's stage play On Your Way, Riley! with Brian Murphy and Maureen Lipman.

External links
Freshwater on broadwayworld.com
Freshwater on the Almeida Theatre website

English male actors
Year of birth missing (living people)
Living people